Andrei Aleksandrovich Gashkin (born 6 December 1970) is a former Russian professional footballer and a current coach.

Club career
He made his debut in the Russian Premier League in 1993 for FC Spartak Moscow.

Honours
 Russian Premier League champion: 1993.
 Russian Premier League bronze: 2000.
 Ukrainian Premier League runner-up: 1995, 1996.

European club competitions
 European Cup Winners' Cup 1992–93 for FC Spartak Moscow: 2 games.
 UEFA Cup 1996–97 with PFC CSKA Moscow: 2 games.
 UEFA Intertoto Cup 1997 with FC Torpedo Moscow: 5 games, 3 goals.
 UEFA Cup 2000–01 with FC Torpedo Moscow: 2 games, 1 goal.
 UEFA Cup 2001–02 with FC Torpedo Moscow: 1 game.

References

1970 births
People from Taldomsky District
Living people
Soviet footballers
Russian footballers
Russian Premier League players
Ukrainian Premier League players
FC KAMAZ Naberezhnye Chelny players
FC Saturn Ramenskoye players
FC Spartak Moscow players
FC Chornomorets Odesa players
PFC CSKA Moscow players
FC Torpedo Moscow players
FC Torpedo-2 players
FC Elista players
FC Nyva Ternopil players
Russian football managers
Expatriate footballers in Israel
Russian expatriate footballers
Expatriate footballers in Ukraine
Russian expatriate sportspeople in Ukraine
Association football midfielders
FC Znamya Truda Orekhovo-Zuyevo players
FC Torpedo Vladimir players
Sportspeople from Moscow Oblast